The 2019 Georgia Southern Eagles football team represented Georgia Southern University during the 2019 NCAA Division I FBS football season. The Eagles played their home games at Paulson Stadium in Statesboro, Georgia and competed in the East Division of the Sun Belt Conference. They were led by second year head coach Chad Lunsford.

Previous season
The Eagles finished the 2018 season 10–3, 6–2 in Sun Belt play to finish in third place in the East division. The Eagles received an invitation to the Camellia Bowl where they defeated Eastern Michigan.

Preseason
On August 2, 2019, it was announced that QB Shai Werts and DE Quan Griffin had been indefinitely suspended following their arrests, which were not related. The charges against Werts were subsequently dropped, after what was believed to be cocaine on his car was tested to be bird feces, and he has since been cleared to play.

Schedule

Game summaries

at LSU

Maine

at Minnesota

Louisiana

at South Alabama

Coastal Carolina

New Mexico State

at Appalachian State

at Troy

Louisiana–Monroe

at Arkansas State

Georgia State

vs. Liberty (Cure Bowl)

Players drafted into the NFL

References

Georgia Southern
Georgia Southern Eagles football seasons
Georgia Southern Eagles football